Origins of New Mexico Families: A Genealogy of the Spanish Colonial Period by Fray Angélico Chávez is an important work on the genealogy of Spanish New Mexican families. The first edition was published in 1954; a revised edition came out in 1992.

Description
In researching the history of the statue La Conquistadora, Chávez came across a number of old church documents. These documents included baptisms, marriages and other vital records detailing the lives of the early Spanish settlers of New Mexico. Chávez realized the value that these documents had to the descendants of these people and began collecting the information in order to create a genealogy about early Spanish New Mexicans. Origins of New Mexico Families is the culmination of this research. 

The book itself is divided into two parts: the seventeenth and eighteenth centuries. Chávez himself admitted in his Introduction that the family histories in the book do not necessarily conform perfectly to these divisions. Chávez discovered two distinct Spanish colonizations of New Mexico. The first colonization occurred in 1598 under the leadership of don Juan de Oñate. In 1680 Pueblo Indians revolted against Spanish rule and the Spaniards were forced out of  New Mexico. In 1693 Diego de Vargas led a second group of families into New Mexico to re-colonize the province.

Both parts are further divided up into family surnames. Each surname section typically begins with that family's male progenitor and includes information on his wife (or wives), children and grandchildren. Some of the family genealogies from the first part continue on into the second part. There are a number of different surnames in the second part because there were new families that entered New Mexico in the eighteenth century and that certain families did not return to New Mexico after the Pueblo Revolt.

The book includes drawings, photocopies and charts. Two drawings by José Cisneros (artist) depict the "Oñate Entrada" of 1598 and the "Vargas Entrada" of 1693. The photocopies are of certain documents such as a pages from inquisition records, matrimonial investigations, and marriage registers. Charts within the book demonstrate specific lineages of Españoles-Mexicanos, French and north-south Spanish, and ordained clerics within the Ortiz family.

Throughout the book, Chávez linked many of the families to himself. In his introduction he acknowledged that this may look presumptive, but that his intention was actually to create a "graphic unifying medium" in order to lend direction to the compilation of  loose facts. He wanted to demonstrate that all New Mexicans were part of one large family and inter-related. Since early New Mexicans did not include any great nobles or major historical figures, Chávez wanted to show that there was a reason for New Mexicans to delve into their own genealogy.

Differences between the two editions
As mentioned before, the first edition only included a genealogy of families from the seventeen and eighteenth century. However, Chávez continued doing research on New Mexico families and in 1956 and 1957 he published a couple of articles in the magazine El Palacio. These articles expanded some of the family genealogies into the nineteenth century and included many names that were unique to that century. In 1992 the editor of the revised edition Thomas E. Chávez added these articles to the book.

Contents of the revised edition
 Foreword to revised edition
 Introduction
 Oñate Entrada by José Cisneros

Part One: The Seventeenth Century
Families alphabetically: Abendaño to Zamorano
Demonstration Chart (Chávez)
Page from Inquisition Records, 1626
Demonstration Chart (Robledo-Romero)

Part Two: The Eighteenth Century
Vargas Entrada by José Cisneros
Families Alphabetically: Abeyta to Zamora
Page from Matrimonial Investigation, 1716
Demonstration Charts I and II (Baca)
Page from Santa Fe Marriage Register, 1734
Page from Spanish Archives of New Mexico, 1712
Demonstration Chart (Españoles-Mexicanos)
Demonstration Chart (French and North-South Spanish)

Appendix
Additional Family Couples in Charts and Other Persons
Demonstration Chart (Ortiz Clerical)

Addenda to original 1954 edition
Families alphabetically: Abeyta to Zarate
New names in New Mexico, 1820-1850
Families alphabetically: Abilucia to Zepeda
Bibliography

See also
 Baca family of New Mexico
 Angelico Chavez

References
 Chávez, Fray Angélico, Origins of New Mexico Families: A Genealogy of the Spanish Colonial Period, Rev. Ed.  (Santa Fe: Museum of New Mexico Press, 1992.)

External links
 Beyond Origins of New Mexico Families
 Hispanic Genealogical Research Center of New Mexico
 New Mexico Genealogy Society

1954 non-fiction books
Spanish-American culture in New Mexico